Torry Jabar Holt (born June 5, 1976) is an American former professional football player who was a wide receiver in the National Football League (NFL) for eleven seasons.  He was named to the Pro Bowl seven times and retired with the 10th most receiving yards, including a record six consecutive seasons with 1,300 yards. He played college football at North Carolina State University, and earned consensus All-American honors. He was drafted by the St. Louis Rams in the first round of the 1999 NFL Draft, and spent the next ten years with the Rams and is remembered as one of the members of the "Greatest Show on Turf."

Early years
Holt grew up in Gibsonville, North Carolina.  He was Prep Football Report All-America selection, adding all-state honors at Eastern Guilford High School in Gibsonville. While there, he caught 129 passes during his career, gaining 2,573 yards and scoring 42 touchdowns including 56 receptions for 983 yards and 17 touchdowns as senior. He also returned three punts and three kickoffs for touchdowns during his career.  Additionally, Holt was a standout defensive back who posted 62 tackles and four interceptions as senior. He was named one of the Top 25 players in the state by the Charlotte Observer. After high school, Holt attended Hargrave Military Academy in 1995. There he caught 21 passes for 524 yards and six touchdowns. Torry also appeared with then-teammate Marshall Faulk in Nelly's Air Force Ones music video.

College career
Holt attended North Carolina State University, and played wide receiver for the NC State Wolfpack football team from 1995 to 1998. In his senior year, Holt was named Atlantic Coast Conference Offensive Player of the Year. That season, he set ACC records of 88 receptions (since broken by Kenneth Moore of Wake Forest) for 1,604 yards and an NC State record of 16 touchdown receptions. Holt was a consensus first-team All-American as senior. He was also a finalist for the Fred Biletnikoff Award, given to the nation’s top receiver. As a junior, he led the team, setting Wolfpack season records with 62 receptions for 1,099 yards, topping marks of 55 by Naz Worthen (1988) while becoming the first player in team history to gain more than 1,000 yards in a season. He started in five of the first seven games as sophomore. He majored in sociology. Holt's number, 81, was retired in 1999.

College statistics

Professional career

Pre-draft

After injuring his knee at the Senior Bowl, Holt, at 192 pounds, ran a 4.44 second 40-yard dash and had a vertical jump of 37 inches at the 1999 NFL Combine

St. Louis Rams
Holt was the sixth overall draft pick in the 1999 NFL Draft and the first selection made by the St. Louis Rams. On July 23, 1999, Holt signed a five-year, $10 million contract, including a $5.4 million signing bonus, with the Rams. In his rookie season, he posted 52 receptions, 788 total yards and six touchdowns on the way to the Super Bowl XXXIV championship. From 1999 to 2001, the Rams scored over 500 points each season, and their offense was dubbed "The Greatest Show on Turf".

For the six seasons from 2000 to 2005, Holt reached at least 1,300 yards every season, a league record of six consecutive seasons. Holt's streak was broken in 2006, due to injuries to himself and other teammates that hindered the offense for parts of the season. Holt came into the NFL as #88, but in 2002 changed his number to 81 (worn by Az-Zahir Hakim previously).

Holt's career also includes 7 Pro Bowls (2000, 2001, 2003–2007) including five straight, 74 career touchdowns for 448 points (including 2 two-point conversions) and 920 career receptions.  He ranks among the top 10 active leaders in receiving yards, receiving touchdowns, and receptions, and has finished in the top ten of those three categories in five straight seasons (2003–2007).  Holt has also led the league in receiving yardage on two occasions (2000, 2003), and receptions once (2003).  Holt is tenth all time in receiving yards, and eleventh all time in pass receptions.

Prior to the 2003 seasons Holt agreed to a 7-year $42 million contract extension that included a $12.5 million signing bonus. Holt led the NFL in receptions in 2003 and led the NFL in receiving yardage in 2000 and 2003. He was a First-team All-Pro in 2003 and a Second-team selection in 2006. On October 15, 2006, Holt became the fastest player in NFL history to reach 10,000 receiving yards doing so in the sixth game of his eighth season and also to 11,000 yards.

His request for a release was granted by the Rams on March 13, 2009. If he was not released, he would have been due $5.65 and $6.65 million in the last two years of his contract.

Holt finished his 10-year career with the Rams starting 147 of 158 games, recording 869 receptions for 12,660 yards, and 74 touchdowns—ranking second in Rams' history in each category behind Isaac Bruce.

Jacksonville Jaguars
Holt was signed by the Jacksonville Jaguars on April 20, 2009, to a 3-year, $20 million deal. Holt had 51 catches, but for the first time in his career he did not have a touchdown reception. Holt was released by the team on February 11, 2010, and only earned $3.45 million of the $20 million contract.

Injuries and retirement
On April 20, 2010, Holt signed a one-year, $1.7 million contract with the New England Patriots, but was placed on injured reserve on August 15, 2010 as a result of a knee injury that required surgery and was released by the team on August 17, 2010 with an injury settlement.

On April 4, 2012, Holt signed a ceremonial contract with the St. Louis Rams to retire with the team. He retired from professional football ranked 10th in league history with 13,382 yards receiving and 13th with 920 receptions.

Hall of Fame Voting
As of 2022, Holt has been a x9 semifinalist for the Pro Football Hall of Fame.

NFL career statistics

Regular season

Post-playing career
On November 20, 2010 during the Raycom Sports broadcast of the annual NCSU game with UNC-Chapel Hill, sideline reporter Mike Hogewood prefaced an interview with Holt stating that he had retired.  Holt has since gotten into broadcasting with Fox Sports, providing commentary for their NFL coverage.

Holt joined NFL Network in 2010 as an analyst on the network’s signature show, NFL Total Access, as well as other NFL Network shows and specials.  He made his debut as an analyst on the NFL Total Access: Pro Bowl Selection Show on December 28, 2010.

He is the older brother of safety Terrence Holt. The brothers co-own Holt Brothers, Inc..

Beginning in 2015, Holt became Heritage High School's (NC) assistant football coach and wide receiver's coach, along with former NFL players Dewayne Washington and Willie Parker.

NFL records
Consecutive seasons with at least 1,300 yards receiving (6).
Consecutive seasons with 90+ receptions (6).
Seasons with 1,600 yards receiving (2, tied with Marvin Harrison, Julio Jones, Antonio Brown and Calvin Johnson).
Highest Average Gain, Game (3 receptions +), 63.00, September 24, 2000
Ranked first in the NFL from 2000-08 with 817 receptions for 11,872 yards and 562 first downs during that span
Ranked in the Top 10 in career receiving yards at retirement, now lies at #17.
Third-highest receiving yards per game, career (77.4 yds/game)
Receptions in a single decade (868, 2000–2009)
Receiving yards in a single decade (12,594, 2000–2009)

References

External links
 

1976 births
Living people
American football wide receivers
Jacksonville Jaguars players
National Football League announcers
NC State Wolfpack football players
New England Patriots players
All-American college football players
National Conference Pro Bowl players
Players of American football from Greensboro, North Carolina
St. Louis Rams players
People from Gibsonville, North Carolina
Hargrave Military Academy alumni
10,000 receiving yards club